Flughafen Berlin Brandenburg may refer to

 Berlin Brandenburg Airport (BER, an airport opened in October 2020)
 Flughafen Berlin Brandenburg GmbH, the owner and operator of this airport

See also
 Berlin-Brandenburg (disambiguation)